Bruno Decarli (15 March 1877 – 31 March 1950) was a German stage and film actor.

Born Bruno Alfred Franz Eduard Schmidt in Dresden, he began his career as a stage actor, later appearing in films. He died in Tiverton, United Kingdom at age 73.

Selected filmography
 The Wandering Light (1916)
 Fear (1917)
 The Love of Hetty Raimond (1917)
 The Man in the Mirror (1917)
 Life Is a Dream (1917)
 Der Richter (1917)
 Das Maskenfest des Lebens (1918)
 The Salamander Ruby (1918)
 The Homecoming of Odysseus (1918)
 The Victors (1918)
 The Ringwall Family (1918)
 Jettatore (1919)
 Sins of the Parents (1919)
 Uriel Acosta (1920)
 De bruut (1922)
 Fridericus Rex (1922)
 Revenge of the Bandits (1922)
 One Glass of Water (1923)
 Victoria (1935)
 Das Herz der Königin (1940)

Bibliography
 Jung, Uli & Schatzberg, Walter. Beyond Caligari: The Films of Robert Wiene. Berghahn Books, 1999.

External links

1877 births
1950 deaths
German male film actors
German male silent film actors
German male stage actors
Actors from Dresden
20th-century German male actors